Auburn High School may refer to:

In Australia 
Auburn Girls High School, Auburn, New South Wales
Auburn High School (Victoria), East Hawthorn, Melbourne, Australia

In Canada 
Auburn Drive High School, Westphal, Nova Scotia

In the United States 
Auburn High School (Alabama), Auburn, Alabama
Auburn High School (Auburn, Illinois), Auburn, Illinois
Auburn High School (Rockford, Illinois), Rockford, Illinois
Auburn High School (Indiana), Auburn, Indiana
Auburn High School (Massachusetts), Auburn, Massachusetts
Auburn High School (Nebraska), Auburn, Nebraska
Auburn High School (New York), Auburn, New York
Auburn High School (Virginia), Riner, Virginia
Auburn Senior High School, Auburn, Washington
Auburn Junior High School, Auburn, New York

See also
 Auburn Middle School (disambiguation)
 Auburn School (disambiguation)